Radiacmea is a southern genus of true limpets, marine gastropod molluscs in the family Lottiidae.

Species 
Species within the genus Radiacmea include:
 Radiacmea inconspicua (Gray, 1843)
 Radiacmea intermedia (Suter, 1907)

References

 Powell A. W. B., New Zealand Mollusca, William Collins Publishers Ltd, Auckland, New Zealand 1979 

Lottiidae